Sirru is a 1998 Maldivian drama film directed by Hussain Adhil. Produced by Villager Maldives, the film stars Reeko Moosa Manik, Shiznee, Rizla, Arifa Ibrahim, Chilhiya Moosa Manik and Jamsheedha Ahmed in pivotal roles.

Premise
Shaliya (Shiznee) is happily married to Rilwan (Reeko Moosa Manik) who secretly is married to Jeeza (Jamsheedha Ahmed). Envious of Rilwan's affection towards Shaliya, Jeeza planned to snatch him away from Shaliya by spreading false rumors regarding her. Shaliya suffered a miscarriage due to an accident while Jeeza was blessed with the news of her pregnancy. Meanwhile Rilwan is having an affair with a third woman Seema (Rizla), a colleague from Airport.

Cast 
 Reeko Moosa Manik as Rilwan
 Aishath Shiznee as Shaliya
 Mariyam Rizla as Seema
 Arifa Ibrahim as Rilwan's mother
 Chilhiya Moosa Manik as Thaufeeq
 Ibrahim Rasheed as Qasim
 Jamsheedha Ahmed as Jeeza

Soundtrack

References

Maldivian drama films
1998 films
1998 drama films
Dhivehi-language films